
Shannon Stirone is an American science journalist and editor, who writes about space travel and the human connection to space exploration. A native of California, she now lives in New York City.

Work 
Stirone has written for numerous publications, including The Atlantic, Longreads, National Geographic, The New York Times, Popular Science, Rolling Stone, Scientific American, Slate, Wired, and the Washington Post. Her work has also been featured in The Best American Science and Nature Writing book series, published by Houghton Mifflin Harcourt, in 2019, 2020, and 2021.

Stirone often writes about advances in space technology such as the Dark Energy Spectroscopic Instrument and profiles the work of scientists in astronomy and related fields like Mike Brown and Konstantin Batygin. Notably, Stirone has been a vocal critic of Elon Musk, his plans to colonize Mars, and the impacts on the night sky due to his Starlink satellites. Stirone has also criticized the billionaire space race.

References

External links 

 Shannon Stirone on Twitter
 Stirone's Substack, The Nature of Things

External links 
 

American science writers
American magazine writers
Sonoma State University alumni
21st-century American non-fiction writers
21st-century American women writers
Women science writers
American women non-fiction writers
Living people
Year of birth missing (living people)